Hindu Temple of Greater Cincinnati or HTGC, is a Hindu Temple in Cincinnati, Ohio. It serves the Hindu Population of the Cincinnati Metropolitan Area. The address of the Hindu Temple is 720 Barg Salt Run Road, Cincinnati, Ohio 45244.

History
The temple opened in May 1997, after years of planning and construction. HTGC hosted Taste Of India, a local event dedicated to various Indian Cuisine. It was the largest Indian Festival to be hosted in the Midwest at the time.

References

Buildings and structures in Clermont County, Ohio
Hinduism in the United States
Religious buildings and structures completed in 1997
1991 establishments in Ohio
Religious organizations established in 1997
Asian-American culture in Ohio
Indian-American culture in Ohio